Gaer is a community and electoral district ("ward") of the city of Newport, South Wales.

The ward includes both the Gaer and Maesglas estates. To the south west of the ward is a listed monument known as the Gaer Hillfort (alternative: the Gollars) a large ancient hill fort and defensive position overlooking the Ebbw River with views south across the River Severn to England and north towards Twmbarlwm and Mynydd Machen. It is believed to date to the Iron Age. The original Gaer House in the area was built in the reign of Queen Elizabeth by Alexander Seys, Esq., second son of Roger Seys, Esq., of Boverton.

The ward is bounded by Bassaleg Road to the north, the Great Western main line to the east, the Ebbw River to the southeast, Cardiff Road to the southwest, and the M4 motorway to the west.

References

External links 

Communities in Newport, Wales
Wards of Newport, Wales